Alexandru Szilaghi (born 8 February 1942) is a Romanian gymnast. He competed in eight events at the 1964 Summer Olympics.

References

1942 births
Living people
Romanian male artistic gymnasts
Olympic gymnasts of Romania
Gymnasts at the 1964 Summer Olympics
Sportspeople from Cluj-Napoca